Burton Forbes (born 6 February 1971) is a South African cricketer. He played in fourteen first-class matches from 1990/91 to 1998/99.

References

External links
 

1971 births
Living people
South African cricketers
Border cricketers
Eastern Province cricketers
Cricketers from Port Elizabeth